Keka Ferdousi (born 4 August 1960) is a Bangladeshi television chef and author.

Early life
Ferdousi was born on 4 August 1960, in Dhaka to Fazlul Haque, a film producer, and Rabeya Khatun, an author. Her brother Faridur Reza Sagar is a film producer. Ferdousi began cooking in class five. In 1980, she moved to the United States. She returned to Bangladesh in 1984.

Career
Ferdousi's first appearance on television was on Shykh Seraj's BTV show Mati O Manush in 1994, where she presented a mushroom recipe.

Ferdousi has since appeared in various cooking shows. She has also written multiple cookbooks and judged cooking programs in Bangladesh as well as abroad. She is currently the president of the Bangladesh Cooking Association and runs the cooking school Keka Ferdousir Rannaghar.

Personal life
Ferdousi married Abdul Mukit Majumder Babu, a businessman and member of the Bangladesh Freedom Fighters. He is the director of the Impress Group. They have a son and a daughter.

Appearances
Cooking programs
 Desh Bideshe Ranna (Channel i)
 Monohor Iftar (Channel i)
 Je Radhe Se Chulo Badhe (Channel i)
 Mayer Hater Ranna (Channel i)
 Rannaghar (Zee Bangla) (In one episode)

As judge
 ACI Pure Sorishar Tel Anondo Alo Jatoyo Vorta Protijogita 2017 (Bangladesh)
 Tommy Mia International India Chef of the Year 2017 (UK)
 The Chef TV Reality Show 2017 (UK)
 Deko Food Limited Bou Sajano Protijogita 2019 (Bangladesh)

Music videos
 Beainshab (2016)

Bibliography
 Diabeteser Mojar Ranna
 Microwave Ovene Ranna
 Sasto Sochaton Ranna
 Desh Bidesher Ranna
 Jhotpot Ranna
 Harano Diner Ranna
 Sonali Diner Ranna
 Thai, Chinese O Indian Ranna
 Mojadar Ranna
 Jhotpot Achar
 Rokomari Nasta

Awards
 2011, Gourmand World Cookbook Awards', from Paris, for Sasto Sochaton Ranna
 2011, The British Curry Awards, special recognition category.

See also
 Alpana Habib

References

Bangladeshi chefs
1960 births
Cookbook writers
Bangladeshi cookbook writers
Women cookbook writers
Living people
People from Dhaka